Soñando por Bailar 2012 was the second season of Soñando por Bailar, an Argentinian reality show broadcast by El Trece. Unlike the first season, this time the contestants were professional dancers and every week they received a score from 1 to 10. The winner of the show got the chance to dance in Bailando 2012 (as the first winner, Eugenia Lemos, who was a contestant in Bailando 2011).

The academy this season is placed in a castle in General Rodríguez. The show was hosted by Santiago del Moro and the jury are Marcelo Polino, Amalia Granata, Silvina Escudero, Reina Reech and Ángel de Brito.

The season premiered was on December 3, 2011 and the finale was on May 6, 2012. Magdalena Bravi was the big winner.

Contestants 

 Belén Alonso was the original partner, but she left the competition after Reggaeton's round. Later, Yanil García replaced her during Disco and Cumbia's round; but she left the competition, too.
 Nicolás Scillama was the original partner, but he left the competition after Disco's round.
 Rodrigo Escobar was the original partner, but he left the competition after Cumbia's round.
 Marién Caballero was the original partner, but she left the competition after Cumbia's round.
 Yanina Iglesias was disqualified because of breaking the rules; in order to replace her, Daniela entered to the show partnered with Yanina's dancer.
 Vanesa Simón was disqualified because of breaking the rules; in order to replace her, Julieta G. entered to the show partnered with Vanesa's dancer.
Facundo González, Rubén Silva & Yanina Iglesias got the opportunity to come back into the competition.

Semifinals
During this stage, 28 semifinalist were introduced in four groups of seven. One semifinalist from each group was eliminated, leaving 24 finalists that would be starting the competition.

Finals
The 24 finalists competed during 25 rounds. From the eight to the seventeenth round, the judges got the opportunity to save the contestants, leaving two of them in the bottom two: one contestant was going to be saved by the public vote, and the other was the eliminated.
This season, two contestants were disqualified, one quit, and three got the opportunity to come back.

Top 24 - Reggaeton

Individual judges scores in the charts below (given in parentheses) are listed in this order from left to right: Silvina Escudero, Angel de Brito, Amalia Granata, Reina Reech, Marcelo Polino.

 Performances:

Highest Score: Rubén Silva
Bottom Four: Magdalena Bravi, Soledad Cescato, Federico Baldino & Salomé Calamonici
Eliminated: Salomé Calamonici

Top 23 - Disco
 Performances:

Highest Score: Emanuel Alegre
Bottom Five: Maribel Varela, Yanina Iglesias, Federico Baldino, Facundo González & Gabriela Flores
Eliminated: Gabriela Flores

Top 22 - Cumbia
 Performances:

Highest Score: Soledad Cescato
Bottom Nine: Leandro Martínez, Julieta Ponce, Julieta Carbonell, Vanesa Simón, Nicolás Ramírez, Federico Baldino, Augusto Buccafusco, Mariano Rodríguez & Emanuel Alegre
Eliminated: Emanuel Alegre

Top 21 - Cuarteto
 Performances:

Highest Score: Yanina Iglesias
Bottom Six: Augusto Buccafusco, Mariano Rodríguez, Maribel Varela, Soledad Cescato, Clara Douradinha & Julieta Carbonell
Eliminated: Julieta Carbonell

Top 20 - Axé
 Performances:

Highest Score: Nicolás Ramírez
Bottom Seven: Joaquín Starosta, Clara Douradinha, Vanesa Simón, Agustín Morgante, Facundo González, Julieta Ponce & Rubén Silva
Eliminated: Rubén Silva

Top 19 - Adagio
 Performances:

Highest Score: Magdalena Bravi
Bottom Five: Vanesa Simón, Maribel Varela, Facundo González, Soledad Cescato & Carolina Puntonet
Eliminated: Carolina Puntonet

Top 18 - Latin Pop
 Performances:

Highest Score: Nicolás Ramírez
Bottom Seven: Ana Izaguirre, Augusto Buccafusco, Yanina Iglesias, Vanesa Simón, Facundo González, Federico Baldino & Mariano Rodríguez
Eliminated: Mariano Rodríguez

Top 17 - Rock N'Roll
 Performances:

Highest Score: Nicolás Ramírez
Saved by the judges:Magdalena Bravi, Soledad Cescato, Agustín Morgante, Julieta Ponce, Joaquín Starosta, Maribel Varela, Augusto Buccafusco, Facundo González & Federico Baldino
Bottom two: Mariano de la Canal & Martín Parra
Eliminated: Martín Parra
Disqualified by the public vote: Vanesa Simón

Top 16 - Lambada
 Performances:

Highest Score: Augusto Buccafusco
Saves by the judges: Maribel Varela, Ana Izaguirre, Daniela Pantano, Julieta Ponce & Julieta Gómez
Bottom two: Federico Baldino & Facundo González
Eliminated: Facundo González

Top 15 - Strip Dance
 Performances:

Highest Score: Soledad Cescato
Saved by the judges: Magdalena Bravi, Clara Douradinha, Maribel Varela, Julieta Gómez & Federico Baldino
Bottom two: Joaquín Starosta & Daniela Pantano
Eliminated: Daniela Pantano
Quit: Leandro Martínez

A second chance - Cumbia & Cuarteto
The eliminated contestants (except for Salomé Calamonici and Daniela Pantano) came back for a second chance, but only two of them got the opportunity to return into the competition. This time, the judges did not score the couples, but they picked four contestants. The choreographers picked another one, and the contestants still in the competition picked another one too. The six pre-selected contestants were sent to the public vote, and finally, three of them were picked to return into the competition.

 Performances:

Automatically eliminated: Vanesa Simón, Julieta Carbonell, Martín Parra & Gabriel Flores
Picked by the judges: Rubén Silva, Mariano Rodríguez, Carolina Puntonet & Yanina Iglesias.
Picked by the judges: Emanuel Alegre.
Picked by the contestants in competition: Facundo González.
Returning contestants picked by the public vote: Yanina Iglesias, Rubén Silva & Facundo González.

Top 17 - Adagio from telenovelas

 Performances:

Highest Score: Magdalena Bravi
Saved by the judges: Augusto Buccafusco, Clara Douradinha, Ana Izaguirre, Mariano de la Canal, Yanina Iglesias, Julieta Ponce, Joaquín Starosta
Bottom two: Franco Ibáñez & Julieta Gómez
Eliminated: Julieta Gómez

Top 16 - Cha cha cha

 Performances:

The production decided that Soledad and Yanina were not going to dance, because they broke the rules. Instead of dancing, they were both sent to the public vote.

Highest Score: Julieta Ponce
Saved by the judges: Maribel Varela, Ana Izaguirre, Clara Douradinha & Mariano de la Canal
Bottom four: Rubén Silva, Agustín Morgante, Yanina Iglesias & Soledad Cescato
Eliminated: Soledad Cescato

Top 15 - Arabic music

 Performances:

Highest Score: Magdalena Bravi
Saved by the judges: Nicolás Ramírez, Federico Baldino, Joaquín Starosta & Franco Ibáñez
Bottom two: Ana Izaguirre & Rubén Silva
Eliminated: Rubén Silva

Top 14 - Pole dance

 Performances:

Highest Score: Magdalena Bravi
Saved by the judges: Joaquín Starosta, Franco Ibáñez, Mariano de la Canal & Federico Baldino
Bottom two: Agustín Morgante & Clara Douradinha
Eliminated: Clara Douradinha

Top 13 - Hip-hop

 Performances:

The production decided that Nicolás was not going to dance, because they broke the rules. Instead of dancing, he was sent to the public vote.

Highest Score: Augusto Buccafusco
Saved by the judges: Facundo González, Federico Baldino, Julieta Ponce & Mariano de la Canal
Bottom five: Ana Izaguirre, Maribel Varela, Joaquín Starosta, Franco Ibáñez & Nicolás Ramírez
Eliminated: Nicolás Ramírez

Top 12 - Electro dance
This week, Reina Reech was replaced in the panel of judges by the winner of the first season, Eugenia Lemos, who scored the couples.

 Performances:

Highest Score: Yanina Iglesias
Saved by the judges: Magdalena Bravi, Joaquín Starosta, Maribel Varela & Ana Izaguirre
Bottom four: Federico Baldino, Franco Ibáñez, Julieta Ponce & Agustín Morgante
Eliminated: Agustín Morgante

Top 11 - Country

 Performances:

Highest Score: Federico Baldino
Saved by the judges: Facundo González, Maribel Varela, Ana Izaguirre & Yanina Iglesias
Bottom two: Joaquín Starosta & Franco Ibáñez
Eliminated: Franco Ibáñez

Top 10 - Reggaeton II
Since this week, the duels won't be part of the show anymore, so the contestants with the lowest scores, lowest performance in camp activities and the contestant with the most negative votes, will be up for elimination.

 Performances:

Highest Score: Julieta Ponce
Bottom five: Yanina Iglesias, Joaquín Starosta, Mariano De la Canal, Ana Izaguirre & Maribel Varela
Eliminated: Maribel Varela

Top 9 - Latin Adagio

 Performances:

Highest Score: Magdalena Bravi
Bottom four: Augusto Buccafusco, Joaquín Starosta, Federico Baldino & Julieta Ponce
Eliminated: Julieta Ponce

Top 8 - Strip Dance II
This round, Marcelo Polino was replaced in the panel of judges by the winner of the first season, Eugenia Lemos, who scored the couples.

 Performances:

Highest Score: Magdalena Bravi
Bottom six: Federico Baldino, Magdalena Bravi, Joaquín Starosta, Augusto Buccafusco, Yanina Iglesias & Ana Izaguirre
Eliminated: Ana Izaguirre

Top 7 - Music videos
This round, Marcelo Polino was replaced in the panel of judges by the winner of the first season, Eugenia Lemos, who scored the couples.

 Performances:

Highest Score: Magdalena Bravi
Bottom four: Joaquín Starosta, Augusto Buccafusco, Federico Baldino & Yanina Iglesias
Eliminated: Yanina Iglesias

Top 6 - Pole dance II

 Performances:

Highest Score: Magdalena Bravi
Bottom Five: Mariano De la Canal, Joaquín Starosta, Augusto Buccafusco, Federico Baldino & Facundo González
Eliminated: Facundo González

Top 5 - Cuarteto II

 Performances:

Highest Score: Magdalena Bravi
Bottom Three: Mariano De la Canal, Federico Baldino & Joaquín Starosta
Eliminated: Joaquín Starosta

Top 4

Semifinal 1
The first semifinal introduced Augusto Buccafusco against Mariano De la Canal. They both danced three different styles, and the judges chose the best of every style, giving the winner of each style, 1 point. Then, the public gave 3 points to their favorite. The contestant with the most votes, went through the final, and the other, was eliminated.

 Performances:

Chosen by the Judges: Mariano De la Canal
Chosen by the Public Vote: Mariano De la Canal
Eliminated as a Semifinalist: Augusto Buccafusco
Finalist: Mariano De la Canal

Semifinal 2

The second semifinal introduced Federico Baldino against Magdalena Bravi. They both danced three different styles, and the judges chose the best of every style, giving the winner of each style, 1 point. Then, the public gave 3 points to their favorite. The contestant with the most votes, went through the final, and the other, was eliminated.

 Performances:

Chosen by the Judges: Magdalena Bravi
Chosen by the Public Vote: Magdalena Bravi
Eliminated: Federico Baldino
Finalist: Magdalena Bravi

Top 2

Final
The final introduced Mariano De la Canal against Magdalena Bravi. They both danced four different styles, and the judges chose the best of every style, giving the winner of each style, 1 point. Then, the public gave 3 points to their favorite. The contestant with the most votes, was the winner.

 Performances:

Chosen by the Judges: Magdalena Bravi
Chosen by the Public Vote: Magdalena Bravi
Runner-Up: Mariano De la Canal
Winner: Magdalena Bravi

Elimination chart 

This was the week where contestants were introduced to the public. Four of them were eliminated, and the rest were the finalists.

Yanina was disqualified after the January 23rd show for breaking the rules. Nicolás, Julieta P. and Vanesa broke the rules as well, but they were sent to the public vote. Finally, the audience decided Vanesa had to be disqualified.

The production decided that Soledad and Yanina were not going to dance, because they broke the rules. Instead of dancing, they were both sent to the public both. Also Nicolás received the same restriction some weeks later.

Magdalena had the highest score this round, but she was sent to the public vote by the negative votes, being saved.

Federico and Magdalena did not performance this date as they were part of the second semi-finale.

Mariano D. did not performance this date as he was declared a finalist the night before.

Highest and lowest scoring performances
The best and worst performances in each dance according to the judges' marks are as follows:

Camp Acitivies Score 
In the second week of the competition, the coach of the camp's activities, Manuel Vismara, has to pick the contestant with the best and worst performances during the week. The contestant/s with the worst performance/s, is/are sent to the duel. The camp activities were not scored anymore from week 18 onward.

 – Best performance during the camp's activities of the week
 – Best performance during the camp's activities of the week but being sent to the public vote/duel for other reasons
 – Worst performance during the camp's activities of the week and sent to the public vote/duel being saved
 – Worst performance during the camp's activities of the week and sent to the public vote/duel being eliminated
 – Safe but being sent to the public vote/duel for other reasons

Negative votes

In week 11, the contestants gave positive votes to the eliminated contestants that were given a second chance to return.

References

External links
  Official website

Sonando 2012
Argentine variety television shows
2011 Argentine television seasons
2012 Argentine television seasons